Pszczyna railway station is a railway station in Pszczyna, Poland. As of 2012, it is served by Koleje Śląskie (Silesian Voivodeship Railways) and PKP Intercity (EIP, InterCity, and TLK services). The station was opened in 1868.

Train services

The station is served by the following services:

Express Intercity Premium services (EIP) Warsaw - Katowice - Bielsko-Biała
Express Intercity Premium services (EIP) Gdynia - Warsaw - Katowice - Bielsko-Biała
Intercity services (IC) Warszawa - Częstochowa - Katowice - Bielsko-Biała
Intercity services (IC) Białystok - Warszawa - Częstochowa - Katowice - Bielsko-Biała
Intercity services (IC) Olsztyn - Warszawa - Skierniewice - Częstochowa - Katowice - Bielsko-Biała
Regional Service (KŚ)  Katowice - Pszczyna - Czechowice-Dziedzice - Bielsko-Biała Gł. - Żywiec - Zwardoń
Regional services (KŚ)  Katowice - Pszczyna - Bielsko-Biała Gł - Żywiec - Nowy Targ - Zakopane
Regional Service (KŚ)  Katowice - Pszczyna - Skoczów - Ustroń - Wisła Głębce
Regional Service (KŚ)  Rybnik - Żory - Pszczyna

References

External links
Station article at  koleo.pl

Railway stations in Silesian Voivodeship
Railway stations served by Przewozy Regionalne InterRegio
Railway stations in Poland opened in 1868